Ron Elliott may refer to:

Ron Elliott (musician) (born 1943), American musician, composer and producer
Ron Elliott (politician), Canadian politician